Contents Under Notice is the debut studio album of experimental ensemble Rhythm & Noise, released in 1984 by Ralph Records.

Release and reception 

Retrospective critical reception of Contents Under Notice has been mixed. Ted Mill of allmusic  described Contents Under Notice as a "mixture of wobbly synth beds, industrial noise, scattershot drum machines, eerie whines, and treated vocal samples." Mills gave the release two and a half out of five stars and criticized it for being too lengthy for what it was. However, Trouser Press reviewed the album more enthusiastically. Ira Robbins said "in its raucous, multi-layered complexity, the piece asymptotically approaches sheer white noise din" and that "maybe this is what Martians with insomnia listen to."

The album has never been issued on CD.

Track listing

Personnel 
Adapted from the Contents Under Notice liner notes.

Rhythm & Noise
Naut Humon – sampler
Rex Probe – sampler, percussion
Z'EV – extended drum set (Rax Werx), percussion

Additional musicians and production
Diamanda Galás – vocals

Release history

References

External links 
 

1984 debut albums
Ralph Records albums
Rhythm & Noise albums